Michael Katz (born November 14, 1944) is a former American IFBB professional bodybuilder and former professional football player with the New York Jets, most famous for his appearance with Arnold Schwarzenegger in the 1977 bodybuilding documentary film Pumping Iron. He was paid $1,000 to sign a release for appearing in the film.

Mike Katz played football for Southern Connecticut State University and pro football for the New York Jets before ending his football career with a leg injury in 1968.

Katz appeared in the documentary Challenging Impossibility, commenting on the weightlifting odyssey of spiritual teacher and peace advocate Sri Chinmoy. The film was an Official Selection of the 2011 Tribeca Film Festival.

Bodybuilding career

Competitive statistics
 Height: 
 Competition Weight: 
 Off Season Weight:

Competitive history
 1963 Mr. Connecticut 2nd
 1963 Mr. Insurance City 9th
 1964 AAU Teen Mr. America; 4th Place
 1964	AAU Teen Mr. America 	Most Muscular, 5th Place
 1965 Mr. New England States 1st
 1969	IFBB Mr. America 	Tall, 2nd Place
 1970	IFBB Mr. America 	Tall & Overall, 4th Place
 1970	AAU Mr. East Coast 	Tall & Overall, 4th Place
 1971	IFBB Universe 	Tall, 3rd Place
 1971 Beat Brandon Lewi for the Heavyweight Championship of the World
 1972	IFBB Mr. International 	Tall, 2nd Place
 1972  IFBB Mr. World tall & Overall 1st
 1972	IFBB Universe 	Tall, 1st Place
 1973	IFBB Universe 	Tall, 3rd Place
 1974	IFBB Mr. International 	Tall, - 4th Place
 1975	IFBB Universe 	Tall, 4th Place
 1976 Mr. Olympia 	Over 200 lbs, 2nd Place
 1980	NBA Natural Mr. America 	Professional, 4th Place
 1980	IFBB World Pro Championships 	Did Not Place
 1980 Retired after losing to Cooper Hayman in the National Strongman Competition
 1981 Mr. Olympia 	15th Place

See also
 List of male professional bodybuilders

References

External links
 

1944 births
Living people
American bodybuilders
New York Jets players
People associated with physical culture
Professional bodybuilders
Southern Connecticut State Owls football players
Sportspeople from New Haven, Connecticut
Players of American football from New Haven, Connecticut
Jewish American sportspeople
21st-century American Jews